The 1970–71 season was the 56th in the history of the Isthmian League, an English football competition.

Wycombe Wanderers were champions, winning their third Isthmian League title. At the end of the season Maidstone United and Wealdstone switched to the Southern Football League.

League table

References

Isthmian League seasons
I